Armin Baniaz Pahamin is a Malaysian entrepreneur who rose to prominence when he was elected the Deputy President of the Proton (car) Edar Dealers Association Malaysia (PEDA) when the Proton car dealers were troubled with foreign companies take-over attempt and the conflict between two largest Proton car distributors in Malaysia, EON Berhad and Proton Edar Sdn Bhd. He was elected the 3rd President of the Proton dealers in 2010.

He was featured as a successful young millionaire by Malaysia Personal MONEY, the Edge financial magazine on managing finances in 2007. Prior to his business endeavour, Armin was with the Commerce International Merchant Bankers Berhad CIMB in corporate finance. Armin was the Executive chairman for Jackspeed Industries (M) Sdn Bhd, a subsidiary of Jackspeed Corporation Ltd, a company listed on the main board of Singapore Exchange. 

Armin is as of 2015,  the managing director of Fasfik (M) Sdn Bhd, the first Malaysian to established the largest chain of independent automotive service centre in Malaysia. He also sits on the board of other private limited companies.

Armin was diagnosed with a Chronic Myeloid Leukaemia when he was 15 years old and underwent a bone marrow transplant a year later at the Hammersmith Hospital, London in 1990. Despite the leukaemia, Armin expedited his study after the bone marrow transplant and graduated when he was barely 20 years old. Armin is also an Ironman Triathlon 2005 finisher, Powerman Malaysia Dualthon 2004 finisher and Kuala Lumpur International marathon 2008 finisher. He celebrated his 20 years leukaemia anniversary in 2009.

Armin graduated with a Bachelor of Science (Honours) in Economics from the University of Buckingham, United Kingdom in 1995.

His father, Datuk Pahamin A Rajab was the former founding chairman Airasia Berhad and the Secretary-General of the Malaysia Ministry of Domestic Trade and Consumer Affair.

References

Other references

 Mercury Securities Sdn Bhd (113193-W)(participating organisation of Bursa Malaysia) (http://www.mercurysecurities.com.my/DOC/MF120309.pdf), retrieved 24 May 2009
Bernama News Fasfik eyes 30 pct Auto Services Sector Market Share
Bernama News Armin Called on state and federal governments to eradicate the red tape for registration of authorised workshops to service Proton vehicles
Business Times Direct Insurance Rebate will wreck auto dealers network
The Star (Malaysia) Armin call government to set up Council to regulate automotive eco system
The Utusan Kerajaan digesa campur tangan
The Edge Financial Stimulus package doesn't fully address troubles of auto sector
The Business Times Ways to get car sector moving again
The New Straits Times Rate cut may hurt car sales
The Harian Metro Gabungan pengedar-pengedar proton mampu tingkat jualan
The Harian Metro Tingkat Jualan
Bernama News PEDA wants to be market leader by next year
Bernama Auto ARMIN: PEDA wants to be market leader
Bernama OPR cut has minor impact on Proton car sales
The Malaysian Digest 
Bernama Red Tape Behind High Cost Of Proton Perdana Maintenance, Say Service Dealers
Airasia Prospectus pg 170
Malaysia Insurance OnlinePEDA- direct insurance rebate will destroy automotive eco system

External links
 Armin Baniaz's Blog (since 2008)
 Fasfik Malaysia

Malaysian businesspeople
Malaysian people of Malay descent
Malaysian bloggers
Malaysian Muslims
Living people
Year of birth missing (living people)
Alumni of the University of Buckingham
Place of birth missing (living people)